The Stoke-on-Trent Built-up Area or The Potteries Urban Area or colloquially, simply "The Potteries" is a conurbation in North Staffordshire in the West Midlands region of England.

It includes the City of Stoke-on-Trent, and parts of the boroughs of Newcastle-under-Lyme and Staffordshire Moorlands.

The area had a population of 384,000 in 2019, a small increase from the 2001 census figure of 362,403 with Stoke-on-Trent making up over 70% of this population. It is sometimes called The Potteries Urban Area due to the area's fame for pottery manufacture ever since the industrial revolution.

See also
 Staffordshire Potteries
 Federation of Stoke-on-Trent

References

 
The Potteries